Laura Magitteri (born 30 December 1988) is an Italian former pair skater. She teamed up with Ondřej Hotárek in January 2006. Two-time (2007–08) Italian national champions, they placed as high as ninth at the European Championships (2007), 13th at the World Championships (2008), and competed at three Grand Prix events. Their partnership ended in January 2009.

Competitive highlights
(with Hotárek)

References

External links

 

Italian female pair skaters
1988 births
Living people
Sportspeople from Como
20th-century Italian women
21st-century Italian women